The Minnesota–Penn State football rivalry is an American college football rivalry between the Minnesota Golden Gophers football team of the University of Minnesota and the Penn State Nittany Lions football team of Pennsylvania State University. The Governor's Victory Bell is awarded to the winner of the game.

History
The Governor's Victory Bell was first presented in 1993 to commemorate Penn State's entry into the Big Ten Conference, with their first league game coming against Minnesota. Penn State won the trophy during the first four matchups, Minnesota the next four, and Penn State the next four after that. In 2008, Penn State recorded the first shutout of the series when they beat Minnesota 20–0; the previous low score for each team was 3 for Minnesota in 1994 and 7 for Penn State in 2004. Minnesota won the matchup in 2013 with a 24–10 victory. In 2019, the #17 Gophers retook the Victory Bell by beating #4 Penn State 31-26.

In 2010, after the University of Nebraska joined the Big Ten as its 12th member, the conference was split into two divisions. Penn State and Minnesota were placed in different divisions and thus, beginning in 2011, the rivalry would be held only four times every ten years. In 2014, the University of Maryland and Rutgers University joined the Big Ten and in 2016, the conference increased its schedule to nine games.  Currently, the two schools will play each other at least twice during every six-year scheduling cycle. Penn State leads the series 10–6. 

In 2019, Both teams were undefeated with Penn State ranked #4 and Minnesota ranked #17. This was the first matchup in which both teams were ranked.  The game went down to the wire and ended with a dramatic interception by the Gophers in their own end zone to win 31-26.

In 2022, Penn State beat Minnesota easily in a White Out game, taking back the trophy with a score of 45-17.

Game results

See also  
 List of NCAA college football rivalry games

References

College football rivalries in the United States
Minnesota Golden Gophers football
Penn State Nittany Lions football
Big Ten Conference rivalries